The Adaptive Execution Office (AEO) was one of two new DARPA offices created in 2009 by director, Regina Dugan. AEO focuses on technology transition, technology assessment, rapid productivity and adaptive systems.

External links
 

DARPA offices